Ashat Nurmagambetuly Raqymjanov (Ashat Nūrmağambetūly Raqymjanov, ; born 10 June 1983) is a Kazakh politician who's serving as the chairman of Nationwide Social Democratic Party (JSDP) since 6 September 2019. Prior to that, he was chairman of the Astana City Branch of the JSDP.

Biography 
Rahymjanov was born in 1983 in Kazakh SSR. In 2005, he graduated from the L.N. Gumilyov Eurasian National University in Nur-Sultan with a degree in political science. Rahymjanov was the deputy chairman of the Astana City Branch of the Nationwide Social Democratic Party (JSDP) where he eventually became the chairman of the branch.

On 6 September 2019, at the 15th Extraordinary Congress of the JSDP, Rahymjanov was elected as the chairman of the party by its delegates, assuming his predecessor Ermurat Bapi's role to which later he criticized the move as being "illegal".

References 

1983 births
Living people
Kazakhstani politicians
Nationwide Social Democratic Party politicians